Clyst St Lawrence is a village and civil parish about 8 miles north-east of the city of Exeter in the county of Devon, England. Historically it formed part of Cliston Hundred. The parish is in the East Devon district and is surrounded, clockwise from the north, by the parishes of Clyst Hydon, Whimple and the large parish of Broad Clyst. In 2001 its population was 105, little changed from the 113 people who lived there in 1901.

The parish church, which is dedicated to St Lawrence, was founded in 1203 or earlier and it retains its granite font of that date.

References

Villages in Devon
East Devon District